Hyman Maurice Mark (May 4, 1891 – February 20, 1961) was a member of the Wisconsin State Assembly from 1921 to 1924 as a Republican. A resident of Hurley, Wisconsin, Mark was Jewish.

Born in Duluth, Minnesota, he was educated in the public schools in Ironwood, Michigan. He was in the clothing and dry goods business and wholesale liquor, laundry, commission merchant, and scrap iron and metal business. Mark died at his home in Hurley after an illness of seven months. He was buried at Sharey Zedek Cemetery in Hurley.

References

External links

People from Ironwood, Michigan
Politicians from Duluth, Minnesota
People from Hurley, Wisconsin
Businesspeople from Wisconsin
1891 births
1961 deaths
20th-century American politicians
20th-century American businesspeople
Republican Party members of the Wisconsin State Assembly